Frank R. Wallace (1932 – January 26, 2006), born Wallace Ward, was an American author, publisher and mail-order magnate. Previously a professional poker player, he is originator of the philosophy of Neo-Tech (also referred to as "Neotech" or "Neothink") an offshoot of Ayn Rand's Objectivism.  He was convicted of various federal tax crimes in the 1990s. During his trials, he challenged the oath he was required to take before testifying which became the case United States v. Ward in which the Appeals Court upheld his right to recite an alternate oath.

Education and career
Wallace Ward graduated from Colby College in 1954. In 1957 he earned his doctorate in Inorganic and Analytical Chemistry from the State University of Iowa. He then worked for nine years as a research chemist for DuPont. He then turned to philosophy and started I & O Publishing in 1968 and served as president, publisher, and editor, writing books and articles under various pen names. One of his books was about how to win at poker.

Publishing company

Wallace owned the Integrated Management Associates publishing company, a spin-off of I & O that publishes books and articles by various writers (including himself) concerning Neo-Tech.

Australian Fair Trading Minister Margaret Keech criticized Neo-Tech as a group of "con-artists", for claiming to select "a small handful of 'special' individuals" to receive "secret wisdom of ages", and then asking the individuals to pay money to obtain these "secrets". The company was the subject of a 2000 ruling by the Advertising Standards Authority of the UK, in which the Authority claimed Neo-Tech had "not provided evidence, other than anecdotal, to show the guaranteed earnings, improvements to health, and other benefits ... had been, or could be, attained".

Neo-Tech philosophy
Wallace's Neo-Tech philosophy is presented as an offshoot of Objectivist philosophy.

Comic book author Alan Grant wrote a four-part Anarky miniseries in 1997, and an eight-part ongoing series in 1999, for DC Comics based on Wallace's Neo-Tech philosophy. Grant said, "I felt he [Anarky] was the perfect character [to express the Neo-Tech philosophy] because he's human, he has no special powers, the only power he's got is the power of his own rational consciousness." Illustrator and Anarky co-creator Norm Breyfogle viewed Neo-Tech as a "modernized" interpretation of Objectivism.

Tax evasion and the "fully integrated Honesty" oath
On March 29, 1990, Wallace was indicted on three counts of tax evasion  and three counts of willful failure to timely file Federal income tax returns or pay taxes.  At his trial, Wallace  proposed an alternative oath written by him, to be used before testifying, using the phrase "fully integrated Honesty." The court denied his request, insisting on a "standard oath."  The court would not allow Wallace to testify in his defense unless he took the standard oath.

Wallace made an opening statement at the trial in February 1991, and cross-examined government witnesses. He also wanted to testify in his own defense, and offered to take both his own oath and the oath prescribed by the U.S. District Court. The District Court refused to allow him to testify unless he used only the oath prescribed by the Court, which he declined to do. He was convicted on all charges. He appealed, in part on the ground that the District Court had violated his freedom of religion, and the United States Court of Appeals for the Ninth Circuit reversed his conviction. The Court of Appeals held that by refusing to allow him to testify unless he used only the oath prescribed by the District Court, the District Court had  violated Ward's First Amendment right to freedom of religion.

Wallace used his own wording for the oath in a re-trial. In the re-trial in 1993, a jury found him guilty of tax evasion for years 1983, 1984 and 1985.

Death
On January 26, 2006 while Wallace was jogging in Henderson, Nevada, he was struck and killed by a car. He was 73 years old.

See also

List of Colby College people
List of University of Iowa people

References

External links

Wikipedia vs Neo-Tech 
www.neo-Tech.com

20th-century American philosophers
American people convicted of tax crimes
1932 births
2006 deaths
University of Iowa alumni
Road incident deaths in Nevada
Pedestrian road incident deaths
Colby College alumni
Place of birth missing